Nilyah or nealia is a common name for several plants and may refer to:

Acacia pendula, native to Australia
Acacia rigens, endemic to Australia